The 2010 FIFA World Cup qualification UEFA Group 3 was a UEFA qualifying group for the 2010 FIFA World Cup. The group comprised the Czech Republic, Poland, Northern Ireland, Slovakia, Slovenia and San Marino.

The group was won by Slovakia, who qualified for the 2010 FIFA World Cup. The runners-up Slovenia entered the UEFA play-off stage.

Standings

Matches
The match schedule was determined at a meeting in Bratislava, Slovakia on 16 January 2008. The August 2009 date in the international match calendar was moved forward by one week, from 19 August to 12 August 2009, at the FIFA Executive Committee meeting on 27 May 2008.

Goalscorers
There were 90 goals scored during the 30 games, an average of 3 goals per game.

6 goals
 Euzebiusz Smolarek
 Stanislav Šesták

5 goals
 Milan Baroš
 Milivoje Novakovič

3 goals
 Tomáš Necid

2 goals

 Václav Svěrkoš
 Warren Feeney
 Kyle Lafferty
 Grant McCann
 Rafał Boguski
 Ireneusz Jeleń
 Mariusz Lewandowski
 Robert Lewandowski
 Marek Saganowski
 Marek Čech
 Marek Hamšík
 Martin Jakubko
 Ján Kozák
 Valter Birsa
 Zlatko Dedič
 Robert Koren
 Zlatan Ljubijankič

1 goal

 Martin Fenin
 Marek Jankulovski
 Radoslav Kováč
 Jaroslav Plašil
 Zdeněk Pospěch
 Daniel Pudil
 Libor Sionko 
 Chris Brunt
 Steven Davis
 Jonny Evans
 David Healy
 Gareth McAuley
 Paweł Brożek
 Jakub Błaszczykowski
 Michał Żewłakow
 Andy Selva
 Ľuboš Hanzel
 Filip Hološko
 Erik Jendrišek
 Miroslav Karhan
 Peter Pekarík
 Miroslav Stoch
 Martin Škrtel
 Andraž Kirm
 Dalibor Stevanovič
 Marko Šuler
 Nejc Pečnik
 Radosavljević

1 own goal
 Seweryn Gancarczyk (playing against Slovakia)
 Michał Żewłakow (playing against Northern Ireland)
 Ján Ďurica (playing against Northern Ireland)

Attendances

References

3
2008–09 in Northern Ireland association football
2009–10 in Northern Ireland association football
2008–09 in Czech football
2009–10 in Czech football
2008–09 in Slovak football
Qual
2008–09 in Slovenian football
Qual
2008–09 in San Marino football
2009–10 in San Marino football
2008–09 in Polish football
2009–10 in Polish football